The Deputy Chief of Navy (DCN) is the second most senior appointment in the Royal Australian Navy, responsible to the Chief of Navy (CN). The rank associated with the position is rear admiral (2-star).

Appointees
The following list chronologically records those who have held the post of Deputy Chief of Navy or its preceding positions. Rank and honours are as at the completion of the individual's tours.

References 

 
Leadership of the Australian Defence Force